Neil Lewis (born 28 June 1974) is an English former professional footballer who played as a defender.

He notably played in the Premier League for Leicester City and later in the Football League for Peterborough United. Between 2001 and 2002 he played semi-professionally for Ibstock Welfare.

References

Since 1888... The Searchable Premiership and Football League Player Database (subscription required)

1974 births
Living people
English footballers
Association football fullbacks
Premier League players
Leicester City F.C. players
Peterborough United F.C. players
Ibstock United F.C. players
Footballers from Wolverhampton
English Football League players